The Hungarian Ice Hockey Hall of Fame, which honours players, coaches, referees and other individuals who have made important contributions to the sport of hockey in Hungary, was founded and the first members were inducted on 16 April 2011. The awards were given by International Ice Hockey Federation president René Fasel one day prior to the beginning of the 2011 IIHF World Championship Division I, that was held in Budapest, Hungary. A total of 22 prizes were handed over, divided between eleven living legends and as many former stars, who have been deceased and were honoured posthumously.

The memorial of the Hall of Fame members were inaugurated on 24 February 2012 at the City Park Ice Rink, one of the oldest ice rinks in Europe, which renovation finished just two months earlier.

List of members

Living legends
 János Ancsin – player
 László Jakabházy – player, coach
 Csaba Kovács, Sr. – player, vice-president of the Hungarian Ice Hockey Federation 
 Péter Kovalcsik – goaltender
 András Mészöly – player
 Gábor Ocskay, Sr. – player, coach, builder
 Antal Palla – player, coach
 György Pásztor – player, sports diplomat, the first Hungarian who was inducted to the IIHF Hall of Fame
 György Raffa – player, coach, leader of the Historical Committee of the Hungarian Ice Hockey Federation
 László Schell – referee, member of the IIHF Hall of Fame
 Viktor Zsitva – player, referee

Posthumous awardees
 Gábor Boróczi – player, coach
 Béla Háray – player
 István Hircsák – goaltender
 Zoltán Jeney – player
 Géza Lator – founder of the Hungarian Ice Hockey Federation
 György Leveles – player
 György Margó – player
 Sándor Miklós – player
 Sándor Minder – player
 Gábor Ocskay, Jr. – player, captain of the Hungarian team that won promotion to the top-tier World Championship in 2008
 László Rajkai – player, coach

See also
List of members of the IIHF Hall of Fame
IIHF Hall of Fame

References

External links
 Hungarian Ice Hockey Federation Official Website
 René Fasel, president of the IIHF opened the History of Hockey exhibition

Ice hockey museums and halls of fame
Hall of Fame
Awards established in 2011
2011 establishments in Hungary
Halls of fame in Hungary